The Roman Catholic Diocese of Tarlac is a diocese of the Roman Catholic Church comprising the whole civil province of Tarlac (except Camp Servillano Aquino in San Miguel, Tarlac City, which belongs to the Military Ordinariate) in the Philippines. The see is the Saint Sebastian Cathedral in Tarlac City.

History 
On February 16, 1963, the Diocese of Tarlac was created from territories from both the Diocese of San Fernando and the Archdiocese of Lingayen-Dagupan. It is a suffragan of the Archdiocese of San Fernando in Pampanga.

The Most Rev. Enrique V. Macaraeg is the current Bishop of Tarlac, who was appointed on March 31, 2016. He was ordained on May 24, 2016, and installed on May 31, 2016.

Bishops

See also
Roman Catholicism in the Philippines
List of Catholic dioceses in the Philippines

References

Tarlac
Tarlac
Religion in Tarlac